Empathy is the capacity to place oneself emotionally in another's position.

Empathy may also refer to:

Music
Empathy (Bill Evans and Shelly Manne album), 1962
Empathy (Mandalay album), 1998
Empathy (EP), by South Korean singer D.O., 2021
Empathy, a 2019 EP by Jean Deaux
"Empathy" (singles), a 2016 collaboration between Jung Yong-hwa and Sunwoo Jung-a
"Empathy", a song by Bassnectar from the 2012 album Vava Voom
"Empathy" (Asian Kung-Fu Generation song), a 2021 song by Asian Kung-Fu Generation

Other uses
Empathy (software), an instant messaging and VoIP client
Empathy, an early name for the drug MDMA
"Empathy", an episode of The Good Doctor

See also

 Empath (disambiguation)
Empathy, Inc., a 2018 American science fiction thriller film
Linguistic empathy, a notion in theoretical linguistics